Rosary Convent High School is a Roman Catholic private-run girls' school in Hyderabad, India.  Established in 1904 by the Franciscan Missionaries of Mary, it continues to be run by these Missionary Sisters who reside in their convent at the school's grounds. The school was established in response to a  need for Catholic girls' education. It became the sister school to All Saints High School, the area's prime Catholic boys' school in those days. These two schools are located on either side of St Joseph's Cathedral in Gunfoundry, Hyderabad, India.

The school is run primarily for Catholic girls, however, others are accommodated according to seats available. The school population is primarily made up of Hindus, followed by Muslims, with Christians making up the minority.

There is another girls' school adjacent to the St Joseph's Cathedral, Hyderabad, also run by the Franciscan Missionary Sisters of Mary named St Joseph's High School, which has a Telugu medium of instruction, where admission is offered for very little or no fees to the poor. St Joseph's School's uniform is similar to that of Rosary Convent, with the exception of a plaid collar and sleeve cuffs, as opposed to the white-collar and sleeve cuffs of the Rosary Convent uniform. This slight difference visually connects the two schools, but it also serves the purpose of the easy transformation of donated Rosary Convent school uniforms into St Joseph's school uniforms.

Education

Rosary Convent High School instructs students up to the 10th standard and prepares students for the SSC (Class 10) Matriculation Examination. The medium of instruction is English. Activities include Religion and Moral Science, Communications, Drama, General Knowledge (Debate), Dance, Art, and Music. Training and activities are also provided in sports including karate, gymnastics, badminton, tennis, basketball, volleyball, skating, aerobics and yoga.

School history
Situated in Gunfoundry (so-called for the ammunition center built by the Nizam of Hyderabad), the school began on January 1904 with a student-body of 60 taught in the Tamil language, and 50 pupils taught in English. The FMM nuns visited the surrounding homes, pleading with parents not to deny their children the benefits of schooling. At a time when education was believed to be the right of only upper castes and males, the nuns had a difficult time convincing the locals to send their children to school.

Soon, the conservative society of Hyderabad came to trust these foreign sisters, sending their daughters to the school. Today the school has grown to a strength of more than 3000 students.

Rosary Convent High School celebrated its centennial anniversary with a year-long celebration that began on 26 January 2003 and culminated with Holy Mass and a Valedictory public function and felicitation in January 2004.

External links 

Franciscan high schools
Catholic secondary schools in India
Christian schools in Telangana
Girls' schools in Telangana
Private schools in Hyderabad, India
High schools and secondary schools in Hyderabad, India
Educational institutions established in 1904
1904 establishments in India